The Oued Oum el Hallalif is a river on Cape Bon, Tunisia. It is located at 36° 56' 33" N, 10° 48' 53" E.

References

Rivers of Tunisia
Oum el Hallalif